Route 148 is a north-south secondary highway in New Brunswick, Canada. Most of the route was previously part of Route 8 prior to the opening of the extended Marysville Bypass.

Route description

Route 148 begins at Route 105 in Fredericton, then heads north through the villages of Nashwaak Village, Durham Bridge, Ross and Pleasant Valley before ending at Route 8 in South Portage.

History

This route was renumbered from Route 8 following that highway being moved to the Marysville bypass in 2014.

See also

References

148
148